The first contested New Democratic Party of Newfoundland and Labrador leadership election was held in 1989 on March 18 in St. John's.

New Democratic Party of Newfoundland and Labrador provincial secretary Cle Newhook defeated Gene Long, the Member of the Newfoundland and Labrador House of Assembly for St. John's East, by 21 votes winning 126 votes on the first ballot to Long's 105 votes with 1 vote being spoiled. The convention was held to choose a successor to Peter Fenwick who had led the party for eight years and was, with Long, one of only two NDP MHAs in the House of Assembly. The 1989 leadership convention was the first contested leadership election in the party's history, the previous leaders having all been elected by acclamation.

Results

References

See also
 2006 New Democratic Party of Newfoundland and Labrador leadership election
 2015 New Democratic Party of Newfoundland and Labrador leadership election
 Next New Democratic Party of Newfoundland and Labrador leadership election

1989
1989 elections in Canada
1989 in Newfoundland and Labrador
New Democratic Party of Newfoundland and Labrador leadership election